Gunta is a Latvian feminine given name. The associated name day is March 28.

Notable people named Gunta
Gunta Baško (born 1980), Latvian basketball player
Gunta Latiševa-Čudare (born 1995), Latvian sprinter
Gunta Stölzl (1897–1983), German textile artist

References 

Feminine given names
Latvian feminine given names